Peñalba de Ávila is a municipality located in the province of Ávila, Castile and León, Spain. According to the 2010 census (INE), the municipality has a population of 123 inhabitants.

Population
The population of Peñalba de Ávila has shown a steady decline since 1900. The largest population in the municipality was in 1910 when the population was 354 inhabitants.

The population as of 2010 was 123 people: 71 men and 52 women.

Cityscape

The streets and buildings of Peñalba de Ávila.

References

municipalities in the Province of Ávila